The 1537 siege of Musashi-Matsuyama was the first of several sieges of Matsuyama castle in Japan's Musashi province over the course of the Sengoku period (1467-1603). The Uesugi clan controlled the castle in 1537, but lost it to the Hōjō clan in this siege; they would regain it, and lose it once more in 1563.

The Uesugi sent for help during this siege by hiding a message inside a dog's collar; the tactic was ultimately unsuccessful.

References
Turnbull, Stephen (1998). 'The Samurai Sourcebook'. London: Cassell & Co.

1537 in Japan
Sieges involving Japan
Battles of the Sengoku period
Conflicts in 1537